The Puma is a German infantry fighting vehicle (IFV) ( or short SPz) designed to replace the aging Marder IFVs currently in service with the German Army. Production of the first batch of 350 vehicles began in 2010 and was completed in August 2021. A second batch of 229 Pumas received funding. Mass production began on 6 July 2009. The companies responsible for this project are Krauss-Maffei Wegmann and Rheinmetall Landsysteme, which created a joint venture, Projekt System Management GmbH (PSM). The Puma is one of the world's best-protected IFVs, while still having a high power-to-weight ratio.

History

Development
The Puma (formerly also named Igel (hedgehog) and Panther) started as a follow-up project to the German 1996 "NGP" project (Neue Gepanzerte Plattformen, "New Armored Platforms"). Its aim was to collect ideas for a common base vehicle that could be used for a variety of tasks including that of the APC, IFV, air defense and replacing and assisting the MBT in the frontline combat role. The NGP project was ended in 2001.

The lessons learned were incorporated into the new tactical concept named neuer Schützenpanzer ("new IFV") in 1998. Planning for the Puma as the successor of the Marder began in 2002. That same year, the German Army (Heer) placed an order for the delivery of five pre-production vehicles and their logistics and training services at the end of 2004. On 8 November 2007, a budget of €3 billion to acquire 405 Pumas (excluding the five Pumas that had already been delivered to the German Army for trials) was agreed upon.

On 6 December 2010, the first two serial vehicles were handed over to the German Bundesamt für Wehrtechnik und Beschaffung.

The Puma successfully completed cold tests in Norway in 2012. In August 2013, two Pumas were airlifted to the United Arab Emirates for hot weather tests. Trials included suitability for hot weather operations, firing and driving maneuvers in desert conditions, as well as firepower and mobility evaluations. During the trials, the temperature profiles inside the vehicle were measured, then compared to the ambient temperature.

On 13 April 2015, the Federal Office of Bundeswehr Equipment, Information Technology and In-Service Support (BAAINBw) granted authorization of use of the Puma IFV. This began a program to "train the trainers" on the first seven vehicles and additional ones until the end of the year, when a training center will be set up to put Panzer Grenadiers of mechanized infantry companies through a three-month course to familiarize them with their Pumas. The Puma officially entered service with the German military on 24 June 2015.

Future
Given the advanced age of the current Marder IFVs, and because the world market does not offer any vehicle comparable with the specifications to which the Puma is built, the acquisition of the new vehicles was unanimously voted for by the budget committee of the Bundestag.

350 Pumas were delivered to replace the more than 40-year-old Marders. Full operational readiness was to be achieved by 2024.

The German Army will use €500 million to modernize 40 Pumas by 2023, with more effective weaponry and communications technology capable of rapidly providing a situation image and GPS coordinates to fighter jets. This variant was cleared for operations in March 2021, after successfully completing the armies tactical evaluation in its second attempt. The German contribution to the NATO VJTF in 2023 is intended to include Pumas to this standard.

There are provisions for hard- or soft-kill systems to defeat hostile ATGMs or RPGs, or for future active/reactive armor. There are also mounts and interfaces for the inclusion of ATGMs on the right side of the turret.

The Puma's large weight reserves and the compact cabin make it very attractive for modification. Most vital integrals are situated in the front, floor, and side walls, which may remain unchanged during such a cabin-oriented modification.

On 28 June 2021, BAAINBw awarded the Rheinmetall-KMW joint venture PSM a EUR1.04 billion (US$1.23 billion) contract to upgrade 154 German Army Pumas to the S1 enhanced design status. The upgrade includes equipping the Puma with the Mehrrollenfähiges leichtes Lenkflugkörper-System (Multirole-capable Light Missile System: MELLS, the Bundeswehr's designation for the Spike-LR), integrating a turret-independent secondary weapon system, new digital radios, high-resolution day/night cameras for the driver and mounted squad, color-enabled optronics for the gunner and commander, and connecting the vehicle with the Infanterist der Zukunft - Erweitertes System (Future Soldier - Expanded System, IdZ-ES) and battle management system. The contract is scheduled for completion by 2029; an option to upgrade another 143 Pumas is included, which combined with the 40 already upgraded would bring all but 13 driver training vehicles in the German Army's inventory to S1-standard. That option was approved in December 2022.

In March 2022 a second batch comprising 229 Pumas of the latest standard was announced to be ordered by the German military.

Eighteen Pumas took part in exercises in 2022, and all of them were inoperable at the end of the exercises. Major General von Butler, the commander of the 10th Armoured Division, described the situation as a "total failure." Consequently, the German government has paused purchases of further Pumas.
The manufactor described the damage as "minor damage" which "was caused by the crew through improper operation"

Design

The Puma, while externally not very different from existing IFVs, incorporates a number of advances and state-of-the-art technologies. The most obvious of these is the incorporated ability to flexibly mount different armour (see below for details). Another feature is the compact, one-piece crew cabin that enables direct crew interaction ("face-to-face"; like replacing the driver or gunner in case of a medical emergency) and minimizes the protected volume. The cabin is air conditioned, NBC-proof with internal nuclear and chemical sensors and has a fire suppressing system using non-toxic agents. The engine compartment has its own fire extinguishing system. The only compromise of the otherwise nearly cuboid cabin is the driver station, located in a protrusion in front of the gunner, in front of the turret.

One measure to achieve the one-piece cabin is the use of an unmanned, double-asymmetrical turret (see photo): while slightly off-center turrets are common in IFVs, the Puma's turret is on the left-hand side of the vehicle, while the main cannon is mounted on the right side of the turret and thus on the middle axis of the hull when the turret is in the forward position.

The outer hull (minus the turret) is very smooth and low to minimize shot traps and the general visual signature. The whole combat-ready vehicle in its base configuration will be air transportable in the Airbus A400M tactical airlifter. Its 3+6 persons crew capability is comparable to other vehicles of comparable weight, like the US American M2 Bradley IFV, the Marder, and the CV9040, but smaller than the 3+8 of the CV9030 and CV9035.

Armament

The primary armament is a Rheinmetall 30 mm MK 30-2/ABM (Air Burst Munitions) autocannon, which has a rate of fire of 200 rounds per minute and an effective range of 3,000 m. The smaller 30×173mm cartridge offers major weight saving advantages over, for example, the Bofors 40 mm gun mounted on the CV9040 because of a much lower ammunition size and weight. The belt feed system provides a large number of rounds ready to fire, while the 40mm offers only 24 shots per magazine. This is not a problem in a CV9040, but would force the Puma off the battlefield to reload the unmanned turret.

There are currently two ammunition types directly available via the autocannon's dual ammunition feed. One is a sub-calibre, fin-stabilised APFSDS-T (T for tracer), with high penetration capabilities, mainly for use against medium armoured vehicles. The second is a full-calibre, multi-purpose, Kinetic Energy-Timed Fuse (KETF) munition, designed with a fuse setting allowing air burst capability for ejecting a cone of sub-munitions. The ammunition type can be chosen on a shot to shot basis, as the weapon fires from an open bolt, with no cartridge inserted until the trigger is depressed. The ammunition capacity is 400 rounds; 200 ready to fire and 200 in storage.

Keeping the weight within the 35-ton limit also led to a smaller calibre for the secondary armament, a coaxially mounted 5.56 mm HK MG4 machine gun firing at 850 rounds per minute and with an effective range of 1,000 m. The ammunition capacity is 2,000 rounds; 1,000 ready to fire and 1,000 in storage. While this is a smaller weapon than the western standard secondary armament (7.62 mm caliber MG), it offers the advantage that the crew can use the ammunition in their individual firearms. In situations where the lower range and penetration of the 5.56 mm rounds is an issue, the high ammunition load of the main gun enables the vehicle crew to use one or two main gun rounds instead. The gun housing can also host the 7.62 mm MG3. The MG4 is to be replaced by the MG5.

To combat main battle tanks, helicopters, and infrastructure targets such as bunkers, the German Puma vehicles will be equipped with a turret-mounted EuroSpike Spike LR missile launcher, which carries two missiles. The Spike LR missile has an effective range up to 4,000 m and can be launched in either the "Fire and Forget" or "Fire and Observe" mode.

In addition to the usual smoke-grenade launchers with 8 shots, there is a 6-shot 76 mm launcher at the back of the vehicle for close-in defence. The main back door can be opened halfway and enables two of the passengers to scout and shoot from moderate protection.

Protection
The Puma was designed to accommodate additional armor, initially planning to offer three protection classes which are wholly or partly interchangeable. Protection class A is the basic vehicle, at 31.5 metric tons combat-ready weight air transportable in the A400M. Protection class C consists of two large side panels that cover almost the whole flanks of the vehicle and act as skirts to the tracks, a near-complete turret cover and armor plates for most of the vehicle's roof. The side panels are a mix of composite and spaced armor. It adds about 9 metric tons to the gross weight. Originally, there was also a protection class B designed for transport by rail. However, it became obvious that class C lies within the weight and dimension limits for train/ship transportation, thus class B was scrapped.

The Puma is protected by AMAP composite armor, the AMAP-B module is used for protection against kinetic energy threats, while
AMAP-SC offers protection against shaped charges.

A group of four A400M aircraft could fly three class A Pumas into a theatre, with the fourth airplane transporting the class C armor kits and simple lifting equipment. The Pumas could be built-up to armor class C within a short time.

The basic armor can resist direct hits from 14.5 mm Russian rounds, the most powerful HMG cartridge in common use today (and up to twice as powerful as the western de facto standard 12.7 mm .50 BMG cartridge).
The frontal armor offers protection against medium caliber projectiles and shaped charge projectiles. In protection class C, the flanks of the Puma are up-armored to about the same level of protection as is the front, while the roof armor is able to withstand artillery or mortar bomblets.

The Pumas of the German Army will be equipped with a soft-kill system called Multifunktionales Selbstschutz-System (multifunction self protection system), MUSS, which is capable of defeating ATGMs.

The whole vehicle is protected against heavy blast mines (up to 10 kg) and projectile charges from below, while still retaining 450 mm ground clearance. Almost all equipment within the cabin, including the seats, has no direct contact to the floor, which adds to crew and technical safety. All cabin roof hatches are of the side-slide type, which make them easier to open manually, even when they are obstructed by debris. The exhaust is mixed with fresh air and vented at the rear left side. Together with a special IR-suppressing paint, this aims at reducing the thermal signature of the IFV.

Another crew safety measure is that the main fuel tanks are placed outside of the vehicle hull itself, mounted heavily armored within the running gear carriers. While this may pose a higher penetration risk to the tanks, it is unlikely that both tanks will be penetrated at the same time, enabling the vehicle to retreat to a safer position in case of a breach. There is also a collector tank within the vehicle, which acts as a reserve tank in case of a double tank breach.

A large number of change requests and bureaucratic requirements drove up costs.

Sensors and situational awareness

The Puma offers improvements in situational awareness. The fully stabilized 360° periscope (PERI) with six different zoom stages offers a direct glass optic link to either the commander or the gunner. Since this is an optical line, it had to be placed in the turret center, one of the reasons why the main cannon is mounted off-center on the turret. Via an additional CCD camera the picture from this line can also be fed into the on-board computer network and displayed on all electronic displays within the vehicle. Besides that, the periscope offers an optronic thermal vision mode and a wide-angle camera with three zoom stages to assist the driver, as well as a laser range finder. The whole array is hunter-killer capable. The commander also has five vision blocks.

The gunner optics, which can be completely protected with a slide hatch, are mounted coaxially to the main gun. The gunner has a thermal vision camera and laser range finder (identical to those on the PERI) and an optronic day sight, rounded off with a glass block. The driver has three of vision blocks, as well as an image intensifier and a display for optronic image feeds. The passenger cabin has a hatch and three vision blocks on the rear right side of the vehicle, one of them in a rotary mount. The rear cabin also has two electronic displays.

All in all, the Puma has an additional five external cameras at its rear in swing-mounts for protection while not in use. Apart from the glass optic periscope view directly accessible directly by the commander and gunner and indirectly via the CCD camera, all optronic picture feeds can be displayed on every electronic display within the vehicle. The provisions for the rear cabin enable the passengers to be more active than previously in assisting the vehicle crew either directly through the vision blocks and hatches, or by observing one or more optronic feeds. The whole crew has access to the onboard intercom.

Mobility
Traditionally, IFVs are expected to interact with main battle tanks (MBTs) on the battlefield. In reality, many IFVs are not mobile enough to keep up with the pace of an MBT. The Puma aims to close this gap with several key technologies. Firstly, its compact, lightweight MTU Diesel engine is unusually strong at 800 kW nominal output, which may make it the most powerful engine in use on an IFV today. Even at the 43 t maximum weight in protection class C, it has a higher kW/t ratio than the Leopard 2 MBT it is supposed to supplement.

The vehicle prototypes have a five-road wheel decoupled running gear and use a hydropneumatic suspension to improve cross-country performance while reducing crew and material stress by limiting vibrations and noise. The road wheels are asymmetrical, mounted closer to each other at the front. This is to counter the front-heavy balance, inevitable because of the heavy frontal armor as well as the engine and drive train which are also situated at the front. The 500mm-wide steel tracks made by Diehl Defence are of new construction and lighter than previous designs.

The serial production vehicles will have a symmetrical arranged six road wheel running gear as shown on released pictures by the manufacturer.

Operators

Current operator
  The Puma has been in service with the German Army since April 2015. 350 vehicles have been delivered as of August 2021. Originally 405 were ordered, but on 11 July 2012 the order was reduced to 350. In March 2022 the German Army secured financing for a second batch of 229 Pumas.: Puma orders were paused in December 2022 due to reliability issues, according to then defense minister Christine Lambrecht.

Potential and future operators

Offered by the German Army to supplement the Leopard 2 and the possibility of manufacturing it under license by FAMAE.

The Croatian Army is looking at replacing 128 M80A IFV in its inventory; the CV90 and Puma are contenders. It requires 108 vehicles: 88 infantry combat vehicles, 4 driver training vehicles, 8 armoured ambulance vehicles, and 8 command vehicles. Budget for the 108 vehicles has not yet been set; however, €400 million is the projected cost of the vehicles. The Croatian version will also come with a 30mm cannon and twin anti-tank launchers. Likely purchase of said vehicles is expected after 2021.

Failed bids

The Australian Army sought a 'Mounted Close Combat Capability' within its Land 400 Phase 3 procurement program. The Puma IFV was one of the potential contenders. In November 2018, Project System & Management GmbH (PSM), the joint venture between Krauss-Maffei Wegmann and Rheinmetall announced the Puma would not compete in the Land 400 Phase 3 project.

The Department of National Defence was considering the purchase of vehicles meant to accompany the Leopard 2 into combat. The CV90, the Puma and the Véhicule blindé de combat d'infanterie were the most likely candidates for the role. A contract of 108, with an option for up to 30 more was looked at. The project has since been cancelled.

Czech Army is looking to buy 210 new infantry fighting vehicles for €2 Bln. between 2019 and 2024. All of them will replace aging BMP-2 in IFV and supporting variants. There will probably be an option to 100 more vehicles. In June 2017 five types of IFV (two versions of CV90, Lynx, ASCOD and Puma) were evaluated during a nine days testing. 
Based on unofficial information from the Czech general staff, Puma might be selected based on its "technological superiority". In December 2018, Puma was shortlisted together with the ASCOD, CV90 and Lynx In October 2019 it was announced that the Puma was being withdrawn from the competition. The manufacturer said that the Czech Army requirements would require an expensive redesign to the existing Puma which it was unwilling to undertake.

The Hungarian Defence Forces was looking to buy 200 new infantry fighting vehicles between 2020 and 2026. All of them were to replace the aging BTR-80 APCs. Eventually the Hungarian government decided on the Lynx.

The United States Army sought a new family of vehicles to replace the aging fleet of M113 APCs and M2 Bradleys with the BCT Ground Combat Vehicle Program. With modification, the Puma satisfied the technical requirements of the BCT Ground Combat Vehicle Program and was offered by SAIC and Boeing. The SAIC-Boeing team was not awarded a technology development contract for their Puma-based vehicle in August 2011, and then filed a protest. The protest was denied in December 2011 based on concerns over the vehicle's force protection features, primarily the proposed active protection system and underbody armor, and 20 significant weaknesses which had potential solutions offered that were judged as inadequate. On 2 April 2013, the Congressional Budget Office released a report that advised purchasing current infantry fighting vehicles instead of developing a new vehicle for the GCV program. Buying the Puma would save $14.8 billion, and was called the most capable vehicle. The Army responded by saying no existing vehicle could match requirements to replace the Bradley.

See also
 ASCOD
 Ajax
 M2 Bradley
 Warrior IFV
 Combat Vehicle 90
 Dardo IFV
 K21
 ZBD-04
 Kurganets-25
 Lynx
 Makran IFV
 Hunter AFV

References

External links

Puma Technical Data Sheet and pictures
Manufacturer website
Krauss-Maffei Wegmann´s Puma site (Manufacturer)
Pictures

Tracked infantry fighting vehicles
Armoured fighting vehicles of Germany
Infantry fighting vehicles of the post–Cold War period
Post–Cold War military vehicles of Germany
Rheinmetall
Military vehicles introduced in the 2010s